Vera is a digital typeface (computer font) superfamily with a liberal license. It was designed by Jim Lyles from the now-defunct Bitstream Inc. type foundry, and it is closely based on Bitstream Prima, for which Lyles was also responsible. It is a TrueType font with full hinting instructions, which improve its rendering quality on low-resolution devices such as computer monitors. The font has also been repackaged as a Type 1 PostScript font, called Bera, for LaTeX users.

Vera consists of serif, sans-serif, and monospace fonts. The Bitstream Vera Sans Mono typeface in particular is suitable for technical work, as it clearly distinguishes "l" (lowercase L) from "1" (one) and "I" (uppercase i), and "0" (zero) from "O" (uppercase o), in similar fashion as Verdana and Tahoma fonts. 

Bitstream Vera Sans is also the default font used by the Python library Matplotlib to produce plots.

Unicode coverage 
Bitstream Vera itself covers Basic Latin and Latin 1-Supplement letters. It comprises only 300 glyphs.

Licensing and expansion
Bitstream Vera was released in 2003 with generous licensing terms and minimal restrictions that are nearly identical to those found in the Open Font License, which was not formalized until two years later. The main restrictions were a prohibition on reselling the fonts as a standalone product (though selling as part of a software package is acceptable), and that any derivative fonts not be distributed under the name "Vera" or use the Bitstream trademark.

The DejaVu fonts are a prominent expansion of the Bitstream Vera fonts.

See also
 Bitstream Cyberbit
 Bitstream Speedo Fonts
 DejaVu fonts
 List of typefaces
 Menlo (typeface)
 TITUS Cyberbit Basic

References

External links

  (Previously hosted at gnome.org -- but page no longer exists.)
 Official download page
 Bitstream Vera derivatives at DejaVu fonts
 Hack is a derivative of Bitstream Vera Mono

Typefaces and fonts introduced in 2002
Humanist sans-serif typefaces
Monospaced typefaces
Open-source typefaces
Typefaces designed by Jim Lyles
Unified serif and sans-serif typeface families